Parambassis pulcinella, the humphead glassfish or humphead perchlet, is a species of Asiatic glassfish native to fast-flowing streams in the Ataran basin (itself a part of the Salween basin) in southeast Myanmar and west Thailand. It is a relative of the perch.

Like other glass perch, Parambassis pulcinella is largely colorless and transparent. 

It grows to 8 cm in length and has a prominent hump in front of the first dorsal fin formed by a very long, thin outgrowth of the supraoccipital spine. The supraoccipital is a central, dorsal ossification on the occipital bone . The hump occurs in both sexes, but is larger in males. 

Dorsal and anal fins have gray or black outer edges, the first dorsal fin and the anal fin each have a row of dots towards the body. Both lobes of the forked caudal fins have black stripes. At the base of the first dorsal fin is a small black spot from which a black stripe extends to the head.

The first dorsal fin is supported by seven fin spines, the second by a fin spine and seven soft rays. The anal fin has three spines and 16 to 17 soft rays. The number of vertebrae is 25. The area behind the dorsal fins is scaleless.

The humphead glassfish lives in large clear-water rivers, especially near waterfalls and large rapids. It is territorial .

References

 Maurice Kottelat (2003): Parambassis pulcinella , a new species of glassperch (Teleostei: Ambassidae) from the Ataran River basin (Myanmar), with comments on the family-group names Ambassidae, Chandidae and Bogodidae. Ichthyological Exploration of Freshwaters, March, 2003, Volume 14, Number 1

pulcinella
Freshwater fish of Asia
Taxa named by Maurice Kottelat
Fish described in 2003